The 2015 Michigan Wolverines softball team was an American college softball team that represented the University of Michigan during the 2015 NCAA softball season. The Wolverines, led by head coach Carol Hutchins in her thirty-first season, played their home games at Alumni Field in Ann Arbor, Michigan. The Wolverines finished the season with a 60–8 record, including 21–2 in conference play. The Wolverines won the 2015 Big Ten Conference softball tournament and qualified for the NCAA Division I softball tournament. They advanced to the finals of the Women's College World Series for the first time since 2005, where they lost to Florida.

Preseason
The Wolverines were ranked No. 8 in the nation according to the USA Today/NFCA and ESPN.com/USA Softball preseason polls, becoming the top-ranked Big Ten school in both listings. 
Sierra Lawrence, Sierra Romero and Haylie Wagner were all named to the USA Softball Collegiate Player of the Year preseason watch list.

Personnel

Roster

Coaches

Schedule

! style="" | Regular Season (48–6)
|- valign="top" 

|- bgcolor="#ffdddd"
| February 7 || vs. No. 1 Florida || No. 8 || USF Softball StadiumTampa, FL || 1–2 || Ocasio (1–0) || Wagner (0–1) || — || 1,167 || 0–1 || –
|- bgcolor="#ddffdd"
| February 7 || vs. USF || No. 8 || USF Softball Stadium || 4–3 ||  || Greiner (1–1) || — || 1,100 || 1–1 || –
|- bgcolor="#ddffdd"
| February 8 || vs. Hampton || No. 8 || USF Softball Stadium || 9–2 || Betsa (1–0) || Babinsack (0–3) ||  || 204 || 2–1 || –
|- bgcolor="#ddffdd"
| February 8 || vs. Illinois State || No. 8 || USF Softball Stadium || 4–1 || Driesenga (2–0) || Romshek (2–2) || — || 217 || 3–1 || –
|- bgcolor="#ddffdd"
|  ||  || No. 7 || JoAnne Graf FieldTallahassee, FL ||  || Wagner (1–1) || Kramer (3–1) || — || — || 4–1 || –
|- bgcolor="#ddffdd"
| February 13 || vs. Georgia Tech || No. 7 || JoAnne Graf Field ||  || Betsa (2–0) ||  || — || — || 5–1 || –
|- bgcolor="#ddffdd"
| February 14 || at No. 6 Florida State || No. 7 || JoAnne Graf Field || 6–5 || Wagner (2–1) || Waldrop (4–1) || Betsa (1) || — || 6–1 || –
|- bgcolor="#ddffdd"
| February 14 || at No. 6 Florida State || No. 7 || JoAnne Graf Field || 2–1 || Betsa (3–0) || Waldrop (4–2) || — || 1,208 || 7–1 || –
|- bgcolor="#ddffdd"
| February 15 || vs. Georgia Tech || No. 7 || JoAnne Graf Field ||  || Driesenga (3–0) || Biggerstaff (0–1) || — || — || 8–1 || –
|- bgcolor="#ddffdd"
| February 20 || vs. Lipscomb || No. 5 || Rhoads StadiumTuscaloosa, AL || 7–1 || Wagner (3–1) || Sanders (3–3) || — || 181 || 9–1 || –
|- bgcolor="#ddffdd"
| February 20 || at No. 3 Alabama || No. 5 || Rhoads Stadium || 8–2 || Betsa (4–0) || Jury (3–2) || — || 2,514 || 10–1 || –
|- bgcolor="#ddffdd"
| February 21 || vs. Lipscomb || No. 5 || Rhoads Stadium ||  || Driesenga (4–0) || Young (2–4) || — || 207 || 11–1 || –
|- bgcolor="#ddffdd"
| February 21 || at No. 3 Alabama || No. 5 || Rhoads Stadium || 4–1 || Wagner (4–1) || Osorio (4–1) || — || 2,710 || 12–1 || –
|- bgcolor="#ddffdd"
| February 22 || vs. James Madison || No. 5 || Rhoads Stadium ||  || Betsa (5–0) || Ford (2–2) || — || 101 || 13–1 || –
|- bgcolor="#ddffdd"
| February 27 || vs. Toledo || No. 3 || Tempe, AZ ||  || Wagner (5–1) || Gooding (4–2) || — || 289 || 14–1 || –
|- bgcolor="#ddffdd"
| February 27 ||  || No. 3 || Farrington Stadium || 7–5 || Betsa (6–0) || Ryndak (6–2) || Wagner (2) || 1,167 || 15–1 || –
|- bgcolor="#ddffdd"
| February 28 || vs. Toledo || No. 3 || Farrington Stadium ||  || Betsa (7–0) || Gross (0–1) || — || 207 || 16–1 || –
|- bgcolor="#ddffdd"
| February 28 || vs. Binghamton || No. 3 || Farrington Stadium || 15–0 (5) || Wagner (6–1) || Miller (2–2) || — || 209 || 17–1 || –
|-

|- bgcolor="#ddffdd"
| March 1 ||  || No. 3 || Farrington Stadium || 6–2 || Betsa (8–0) || Macha (7–4) ||  || 1,115 || 18–1 || –
|- bgcolor="#ddffdd"
| March 4 || at Cal State Fullerton || No. 3 || Anderson Family FieldFullerton, CA || 9–0 || Wagner (7–1) || Ybarra (5–5) || — || 945 || 19–1 || –
|- bgcolor="#ffdddd"
| March 5 ||  || No. 3 || Anderson Family Field || 0–2 (8) || Macha (8–4) || Betsa (8–1) || — || 345 || 19–2 || –
|- bgcolor="#ffdddd"
| March 5 || vs. No. 1 Florida || No. 3 || Anderson Family Field || 4–7 || Ocasio (8–0) || Betsa (8–2) || — || 375 || 19–3 || –
|- bgcolor="#ddffdd"
| March 6 || vs. San Jose State || No. 3 || Anderson Family Field ||  || Betsa (9–1) || Lang (4–4) || — || 1,042 || 20–3 || –
|- bgcolor="#ddffdd"
| March 6 || vs. No. 9 Baylor || No. 3 || Anderson Family Field ||  || Wagner (8–1) || Stearns (4–3) || — || 511 || 21–3 || –
|- bgcolor="#ddffdd"
| March 7 || vs. San Diego State || No. 3 || Anderson Family Field || 10–2 (5) || Wagner (9–1) || Cable (2–3) || — || 1,850 || 22–3 || –
|- bgcolor="#ffdddd"
|  || Kent State || No. 3 || Alumni FieldAnn Arbor, MI || 0–3 || Johnson (6–2) || Wagner (9–2) || — || — || 22–4 || –
|- bgcolor="#ddffdd"
| March 14 || Kent State || No. 3 || Alumni Field ||  || Betsa (10–2) || Ladines (3–3) || — || 1,051 || 23–4 || –
|- bgcolor="#ddffdd"
| March 15 || Kent State || No. 3 || Alumni Field || 4–1 || Betsa (11–2) || Johnson (6–3) || — || 1,021 || 24–4 || –
|- bgcolor="#ddffdd"
| March 18 || Bowling Green || No. 4 || Alumni Field || 8–1 || Wagner (10–2) || Combs (1–3) || — || 712 || 25–4 || –
|- bgcolor="#ddffdd"
| March 20 || at Ohio State || No. 4 || Buckeye FieldColumbus, OH || 13–1 || Betsa (12–2) || O'Reilly (7–2) || — || 215 || 26–4 || 1–0
|- bgcolor="#ddffdd"
| March 21 || at Ohio State || No. 4 || Buckeye Field ||  || Wagner (11–2) ||  || — || 412 || 27–4 || 2–0
|- bgcolor="#ddffdd"
| March 22 || at Ohio State || No. 4 || Buckeye Field ||  || Betsa (13–2) || O'Reilly (7–3) || — || 388 || 28–4 || 3–0
|- bgcolor="#ddffdd"
| March 25 || Western Michigan || No. 4 || Alumni Field || 8–2 || Wagner (12–2) || Binkowski (3–6) || — || 659 || 29–4 || –
|- bgcolor="#bbbbbb"
| March 27 || Iowa || No. 4 || colspan=9| Postponed
|- bgcolor="#ddffdd"
| March 28 || Iowa || No. 4 || Alumni Field || 6–0 || Betsa (14–2) ||  || — || — || 30–4 || 4–0
|- bgcolor="#ddffdd"
| March 28 || Iowa || No. 4 || Alumni Field || 7–4 || Wagner (13–2) || Yoways (2–10) || Betsa (2) || 1,136 || 31–4 || 5–0
|- bgcolor="#ffdddd"
| March 29 || Iowa || No. 4 || Alumni Field || 4–6 ||  || Betsa (14–3) || — || 967 || 31–5 || 5–1
|-

|- bgcolor="#ffdddd"
| April 3 ||  || No. 4 || JSC StadiumMinneapolis, MN ||  ||  || Betsa (14–4) || — || 401 || 31–6 || 5–2
|- bgcolor="#ddffdd"
| April 4 || at No. 14 Minnesota || No. 4 || JSC Stadium || 9–4 || Wagner (14–2) || Anderson (5–2) ||  || 1,119 || 32–6 || 6–2
|- bgcolor="#ddffdd"
| April 5 || at No. 14 Minnesota || No. 4 || JSC Stadium ||  || Betsa (15–4) ||  || — || 327 || 33–6 || 7–2
|- bgcolor="#ddffdd"
| April 7 || Eastern Michigan || No. 4 || Alumni Field ||  || Wagner (15–2) || Rich (6–14) || — || 952 || 34–6 || –
|- bgcolor="#ddffdd"
|  || at Rutgers || No. 4 || Rutgers Softball ComplexPiscataway, NJ || || Betsa (16–4) || Landrith (11–6) || — || 157 || 35–6 || 8–2
|- bgcolor="#ddffdd"
| April 11 || at Rutgers || No. 4 || Rutgers Softball Complex || || Wagner (16–2) || Maddox (5–4) || — || 361 || 36–6 || 9–2
|- bgcolor="#ddffdd"
| April 12 || at Rutgers || No. 4 || Rutgers Softball Complex || 5–0 || Betsa (17–4) || Landrith (11–7) || — || 227 || 37–6 || 10–2
|- bgcolor="#ddffdd"
| April 15 || at Michigan State || No. 4 || Secchia StadiumEast Lansing, MI ||  || Betsa (18–4) || Rainey (1–9) || — || 1,047 || 38–6 || 11–2
|- bgcolor="#ddffdd"
| April 17 || Indiana || No. 4 || Alumni Field ||  || Betsa (19–4) || Olson (10–21) || — || 1,415 || 39–6 || 12–2
|- bgcolor="#ddffdd"
| April 18 || Indiana || No. 4 || Alumni Field || 3–0 || Wagner (17–2) || Olson (10–22) || — || — || 40–6 || 13–2
|- bgcolor="#ddffdd"
| April 18 || Indiana || No. 4 || Alumni Field || 7–1 || Betsa (20–4) || Tamayo (4–8) || — || 1,909 || 41–6 || 14–2
|- bgcolor="#bbbbbb"
| April 19 || Indiana || No. 4 || Alumni Field || colspan=9| Postponed
|- bgcolor="#ddffdd"
| April 21 || Michigan State || No. 4 || Alumni Field || 4–3 || Wagner (18–2) || Rainey (1–11) || — || 1,105 || 42–6 || 15–2
|- bgcolor="#bbbbbb"
| April 22 || Central Michigan || No. 4 || Alumni Field || colspan=9| Postponed
|- bgcolor="#ddffdd"
| April 24 || at Maryland || No. 4 || Maryland Softball StadiumCollege Park, MD ||  || Betsa (21–4) || Dewey (6–11) || — || 512 || 43–6 || 16–2
|- bgcolor="#ddffdd"
| April 25 || at Maryland || No. 4 || Maryland Softball Stadium ||  || Wagner (19–2) || Schmeiser (18–8) || — || 941 || 44–6 || 17–2
|- bgcolor="#ddffdd"
| April 26 || at Maryland || No. 4 || Maryland Softball Stadium || 1–0 || Betsa (22–4) || Schmeiser (18–9) || — || 625 || 45–6 || 18–2
|-

|- bgcolor="#ddffdd"
| May 1 || Penn State || No. 3 || Alumni Field ||  || Betsa (23–4) || Cummings (7–8) || — || 1,735 || 46–6 || 19–2
|- bgcolor="#ddffdd"
| May 2 || Penn State || No. 3 || Alumni Field ||  || Wagner (20–2) || Laubach (12–10) || — || 1,852 || 47–6 || 20–2
|- bgcolor="#ddffdd"
| May 3 || Penn State || No. 3 || Alumni Field ||  || Betsa (24–4) || Cummings (7–9) || — || 2,500 || 48–6 || 21–2
|-

|-
! style="" | Postseason (12–2)
|-

|-
|- bgcolor="#ddffdd"
| May 8 || Penn State (9) || No. 3 (1) || Buckeye Field ||  || Betsa (25–4) || Cummings (7–10) || — || 1,345 || 49–6 || 1–0
|- bgcolor="#ddffdd"
| May 9 || Northwestern (4) || No. 3 (1) || Buckeye Field ||  || Betsa (26–4) || Wood (16–10) || — || — || 50–6 || 2–0
|- bgcolor="#ddffdd"
| May 9 || Nebraska (3) || No. 3 (1) || Buckeye Field || 6–1 || Wagner (21–2) || McClure (9–3) || — || 1,476 || 51–6 || 3–0
|-

|-
|- bgcolor="#ddffdd"
| May 15 || Oakland || No. 3 (3) || Alumni Field ||  || Betsa (27–4) || Kownacki (16–13) || — || 2,087 || 52–6 || 1–0
|- bgcolor="#ddffdd"
| May 16 || No. 19 California || No. 3 (3) || Alumni Field ||  || Betsa (28–4) || Trzcinski (15–6) || — || 2,237 || 53–6 || 2–0
|- bgcolor="#ddffdd"
| May 17 || Pittsburgh || No. 3 (3) || Alumni Field || 10–3 || Betsa (29–4) || King (20–9) || — || 2,144 || 54–6 || 3–0
|-

|-
|- bgcolor="#ddffdd"
| May 21 || No. 14 Georgia (14) || No. 3 (3) || Alumni Field || 10–3 || Betsa (30–4) || Wilkinson (28–10) || — || 2,136 || 55–6 || 1–0
|- bgcolor="#ddffdd"
| May 22 || No. 14 Georgia (14) || No. 3 (3) || Alumni Field || 7–6 || Wagner (22–2) || Wilkinson (28–11) || Betsa (4) || 2,582 || 56–6 || 2–0
|-

|-
|- bgcolor="#ddffdd"
| May 28 || vs. No. 6 Alabama (6) || No. 3 (3) || ASA Hall of Fame StadiumOklahoma City, OK || 5–0 || Betsa (31–4) || Osorio (21–9) || — || 8,360 || 57–6 || 1–0
|- bgcolor="#ddffdd"
| May 29 || vs. No. 7 UCLA (7) || No. 3 (3) || ASA Hall of Fame Stadium || 10–4 || Wagner (23–2) || Carda (32–7) || — || 9,425 || 58–6 || 2–0
|- bgcolor="#ddffdd"
| May 31 || vs. No. 8 LSU (5) || No. 3 (3) || ASA Hall of Fame Stadium || 6–3 || Wagner (24–2) || Hoover (18–7) || — || 9,274 || 59–6 || 3–0
|- bgcolor="#ffdddd"
| June 1 || vs. No. 2 Florida (1) || No. 3 (3) || ASA Hall of Fame Stadium || 2–3 || Ocasio (18–3) || Betsa (31–5) || Gourley (5) || 8,329 || 59–7 || 3–1
|- bgcolor="#ddffdd"
| June 1 || vs. No. 2 Florida (1) || No. 3 (3) || ASA Hall of Fame Stadium || 1–0 || Wagner (25–2) || Haeger (31–2) || — || 8,254 || 60–7 || 4–1
|- bgcolor="#ffdddd"
| June 1 || vs. No. 2 Florida (1) || No. 3 (3) || ASA Hall of Fame Stadium || 1–4 || Haeger (32–2) || Wagner (25–3) || — || 7,680 || 60–8 || 4–2
|-

|- 
|- style="text-align:center;"
|

Ranking movement

Awards and honors

References

Michigan
Michigan Wolverines softball team
Michigan
Big Ten Conference softball champion seasons
Michigan Wolverines softball seasons
Women's College World Series seasons